John Arthur Somer (22 April 1891 – 17 September 1939) was an Australian rules footballer who played with St Kilda and Collingwood in the Victorian Football League (VFL).

Notes

External links 

Jack Somer's profile at Collingwood Forever

1891 births
1939 deaths
Australian rules footballers from Victoria (Australia)
St Kilda Football Club players
Collingwood Football Club players
Sandringham Football Club players